Game Face is a 2015 sports documentary film directed by Michiel Thomas and produced by Mark Schoen. The documentary revolves around two LGBTQ American athletes, professional mixed martial artist Fallon Fox and college basketball player Terrence Clemens. Both stories run parallel to each other to follow the journey of the first transgender woman professional MMA fighter and Clemens, a closeted gay male, who gets accepted to play basketball in Oklahoma. The film follows both athletes through their coming out process with the support of their friends and family.

Film festivals 
 The Toronto LGBT Film Festival screened Game Face on May 23, 2015 on their 25th annual anniversary.
 Fringe! Queer Film and Arts Fest in London screened Game Face on November 28, 2015.
 Game Face premiered in Dublin at the GAZE International LGBT Film Festival.
 The Kaleidoscope Film Festival in Arkansas, USA screened Game Face on July 31, 2015.

References

External links 
 

Documentary films about LGBT sportspeople
African-American LGBT-related films
2015 films
2015 documentary films
Transgender-related documentary films
2015 LGBT-related films
Films about trans women
2010s English-language films
2010s American films